George Thomas Saunders (29 November 1907- 14 November 1996) was an English athlete who competed in the 1934 British Empire Games.

At the 1934 Empire Games he was a member of the English relay team which won the gold medal in the 4×110 yards event. In the 100 yards competition he finished fourth.

External links
Profile at TOPS in athletics

1907 births
1996 deaths
English male sprinters
Athletes (track and field) at the 1934 British Empire Games
Commonwealth Games gold medallists for England
Commonwealth Games medallists in athletics
Medallists at the 1934 British Empire Games